The Pyeongchang Olympic Stadium was a temporary venue for the opening and closing ceremonies of the 2018 Winter Olympics and Paralympics in Pyeongchang County, Gangwon Province, South Korea. The stadium was demolished after the Games.

Background

To limit its costs, the stadium had no roof or a central heating system. It cost ₩116 billion ($109 million). The 35,000-seat stadium had seven floors above ground, a single floor underground, and a pentagonal design.

Built on an  site in Hoenggye, it was the final major structure built for these Games.

Adjacent to the stadium was an Olympic exhibition hall, traditional food markets, and other attractions, which would remain as heritage facilities and the medal plaza which hosted medal ceremonies.

History
In the bid book of PyeongChang 2018, the Opening and Closing Ceremonies were planned to take place in Alpensia Ski Jumping Stadium. As they did not plan to build an Olympic Stadium and so a plan similar to the one developed by Lillehammer for the 1994 Winter Olympics was presented. However, in July 2012, the POCOG announced some changes to the project and the venues plan and the ceremonies were moved to Hoenggye. The main reasons were organisational, with possible interference between the preparation of the ceremonies and the ski jumping training, and the extreme weather conditions for the spectators.

The construction of the stadium which took one year and ten months was completed on 30 September 2017.

The stadium only hosted five events before it was demolished, beginning with the Dream Concert—a special K-pop concert on 4 November 2017 to mark 100 days remaining before the opening ceremonies. Among the concert, the opening and closing ceremonies of the 2018 Winter Olympics, and the opening and closing ceremonies of the 2018 Winter Paralympics.

See also
Théâtre des Cérémonies, a similar temporary facility for the 1992 Winter Olympics.

References

External links

Pyeongchang Olympic Stadium on "Pyeongchang 2018" website

Venues of the 2018 Winter Olympics
Sports venues in Pyeongchang County
Olympic stadiums
Sports venues completed in 2017
2017 establishments in South Korea
Sports venues demolished in 2018
2018 disestablishments in South Korea